Krisztina Fazekas-Zur (born 1 August 1980) is a Hungarian sprint canoer who has competed since the mid-2000s. She won nine medals at the ICF Canoe Sprint World Championships with four golds (K-4 200 m: 2001, K-4 500 m: 2006, K-4 1000 m: 2003, 2007) and five silvers (K-1 : 2009, K-4 200 m: 2007, 2009; K-4 500 m: 2007; K-1 1000 m: 2011).

Fazekas-Zur also won gold medals in the kayak four (K-4) 500 m team event at the 2012 and 2016 Olympics.

Personal life
Fazekas-Zur took up canoeing aged 10 together with her sister, following the example of her brother. She is married to her coach Rami Zur, a former Olympic canoeist for Israel and United States; they have a son Noah. She lives in California and represented the United States in 2011, but returned to competing for Hungary winning gold at the 2012 Summer Olympics and also at the 2016 Summer Olympics in Rio.

In 2013, she founded the Path of Champions Foundation that aims to help children through sport.

Awards
 For Pilisvörösvár award (2006)
 Honorary Citizen of Pilisvörösvár (2012)
 Pilisvörösvár Jubilee Medal (2012)
 Perpetual champion of Hungarian Kayak-Canoe (2012)

Orders and special awards
   Order of Merit of Hungary – Officer's Cross (2012)
   Order of Merit of Hungary – Commander's Cross (2016)

References

External links

 
 
 
 
 

 

1980 births
Living people
Hungarian female canoeists
Canoeists at the 2012 Summer Olympics
Canoeists at the 2016 Summer Olympics
Olympic canoeists of Hungary
Olympic gold medalists for Hungary
Olympic medalists in canoeing
ICF Canoe Sprint World Championships medalists in kayak
Medalists at the 2012 Summer Olympics
Medalists at the 2016 Summer Olympics
Canoeists from Budapest